Bismarck Township may refer to:
 Bismarck Township, Michigan
 Bismarck Township, Sibley County, Minnesota

See also
Bismark Township, Nebraska (disambiguation)

Township name disambiguation pages